Polemicella is a small genus of very small sea snails, pyramidellid gastropod mollusks or micromollusks in the family Odostomiidae.

Nomenclature
The name Polemicella is not available from Saurin (Annales de la Faculté des Sciences de Saïgon, (1959): 242), who did not explicitly designated a type species ("doubtful OD" according to Schander et al.)

Shell description
The original description by Laseron (1959) (in French) states that the genus was introduced for forms of the near Pyrgulina polemica: short shell with graduated, streamlined or angled whorls on the periphery. It is sculpted with axial ribs and with a single spiral on periphery. There is sometimes a spiral towards the summit of the whorls. Pyrgulina mellvilli is also a representative typical of this genus.

Life history
Nothing is known about the biology of the members of this genus. As is true of most members of the Pyramidellidae sensu lato, they are most likely to be ectoparasites.

Species
Species within the genus Polemicella include:
 Polemicella aartseni Robba, Di Geronimo, Chaimanee, Negri & Sanfilippo, 2003
 Polemicella dautzenbergi (Melvill, 1910) 
 Polemicella piscatorum Saurin, 1959
 Polemicella polemica (Melvill, 1910) (type species) (as Pyrgulina polemica)
 Polemicella saurini Robba, Di Geronimo, Chaimanee, Negri & Sanfilippo, 2003

References

 
 Schander C., van Aartsen J.J. & Corgan J.C. (1999). Families and genera of the Pyramidelloidea (Mollusca: Gastropoda). Bollettino Malacologico 34 (9-12): 145–166 page(s): 150

Pyramidellidae
Gastropod genera